Walter Winkler (2 February 1943 – 4 June 2014) was a Polish footballer. He played 23 times for Poland.

References

 

1943 births
2014 deaths
Polish footballers
Poland international footballers
Polonia Bytom players
RC Lens players
Expatriate footballers in France
Ligue 1 players
Polish expatriate footballers
People from Piekary Śląskie
Sportspeople from Bytom
Polish football managers
Polonia Bytom managers
Association football defenders